Granulina torosa is a species of very small sea snail, a marine gastropod mollusk or micromollusk in the family Marginellidae.

Description
The length of the shell attains 2.2 mm.

Distribution
This marine species was found in the Strait of Gibraltar.

References

External links
 Gofas S. (1992) Le genre Granulina (Marginellidae) en Méditerranée et dans l'Atlantique oriental. Bollettino Malacologico 28(1-4): 1-26
 S.; Le Renard, J.; Bouchet, P. (2001). Mollusca. in: Costello, M.J. et al. (eds), European Register of Marine Species: a check-list of the marine species in Europe and a bibliography of guides to their identification. Patrimoines Naturels. 50: 180-213

Granulinidae
Gastropods described in 1992